Dispersed Camping is the term given to camping in the United States on public land other than in designated campsites. This type of camping is most common on national forest and Bureau of Land Management land. Designated campsites often offer services to the campers, such as trash removal, toilet facilities, tables and/or fire pits, which are not available at dispersed camping locations. Although dispersed camping takes place on public land, each managing agency has specific regulations for dispersed camping, though they generally all also require campers to follow Leave No Trace guidelines. Other terms used for this type of camping can be boondocking, dry camping or wild camping.

References

Camping